Narystau (Narıśtaw) is a rural locality (a selo) in Ilchigulovsky Selsoviet, Miyakinsky District, Bashkortostan, Russia. The population was 331 as of 2010. There are 3 streets.

Geography 
Narystau is located 45 km northeast of Kirgiz-Miyaki (the district's administrative centre) by road. Chebenli is the nearest rural locality.

References 

Rural localities in Miyakinsky District